El Marsa District is a district of Chlef Province, Algeria.

Communes 
The district is further divided into 2 communes:

 El Marsa
 Moussadek

References

Districts of Chlef Province